Calvitimela is a lichen genus in the family Tephromelataceae (Lecanorales, Lecanoromycetes). Members of the family Tephromelataceae are crustose lichens with green photobionts and lecideine or lecanorine apothecia. The species in Calvitimela have lecideine apothecia, are saxicolous and are primarily found in alpine to arctic regions.

Species

Calvitimela currently includes ten species:

Calvitimela aglaea (Sommerf.) Hafellner
Calvitimela armeniaca (DC.) Hafellner (type species) 
Calvitimela austrochilensis Fryday 
Calvitimela cuprea Haugan & Timdal
Calvitimela livida Haugan & Timdal
Calvitimela melaleuca (Sommerf.) R. Sant
Calvitimela perlata (Haugan & Timdal) R. Sant
Calvitimela septentrionalis (Hertel & Rambold) McCune
Calvitimela talayana (Haugan & Timdal) M.P. Andreev 
Calvitimela uniseptata G. Thor

Taxonomy
The taxonomic history of Calvitimela is long and relatively complex. In the early days, the species now belonging to Calvitimela were placed in the classical genus Lecidea Ach., e.g. by Fries (1874; as Lecidea strips L. armeniacae). and Magnusson (1931; as “Lecidea armeniaca- und elata-Gruppe”) In the 1980s, several taxonomists revised large groups of lichens in Lecanora and Lecidea. First, the generic name Tephromela was resurrected, and the new monotypic family Tephromelataceae described. Then, a group from Lecidea was moved into the genus Tephromela M. Choisy. This led to species with both lecanorine and lecideine apothecia being present in the same genus. Finally, the genus Calvitimela was erected for species with lecideine apothecia previously placed in Tephromela. Tephromelataceae consists of the Tephromela, Calvitimela, Mycoblastus Norman and Violella T. Sprib, and together these four genera constitute a well-supported monophyletic group.

Morphology, anatomy, and chemistry
The species of Calvitimela are crustose lichens. Their thallus are areolate and their apothecia lecideine. The apothecia are convex, black and shiny. Apothecia are rare or entirely absent in some sorediate species e.g. C. cuprea, C. livida  and C. talayana.

Ascii are generally of the Lecanora-type, but Bacidia-type ascii are also observed in C. aglaea and C. perlata. The spores are usually simple and ellipsoid. There is much chemical variation of secondary metabolites in the species of Calvitimela. Most prominently observed in the C. melaleuca – complex, with alectorialic, norstictic, roccellic and psoromic acids occurring in different combinations in the species´ several chemotypes.

Ecology and distribution
All species of Calvitimela grow on rocks. The species in Calvitimela reside either on boulders of varying size or directly on mountainous walls and are occasionally found on pebbles. A peculiar ecological preference is observed in C. cuprea. This species is more or less morphologically identical to C. livida, but seem to only grow on copper rich rocks, and is associated with old copper mine localities.

Species in Calvitimela are predominantly distributed in alpine to arctic regions, and they seem to have a circumpolar distribution. On the other hand, due to lack of sampling in certain regions of the world (e.g. Africa, Asia and South America), the true distribution of Calvitimela is only partly known. C. austrochilensis is described from Chile  and C. uniseptata from Antarctica, respectively. These species have not yet been included in any molecular phylogenetic studies. Therefore, whether they belong in Calvitimela or not, is yet to be confirmed by molecular data.

Phylogeny
Molecular phylogenetics has revolutionized the taxonomy of crustose lichens and revealed an extensive amount of cryptic species diversity. In Calvitimela there are some species that are morphologically identical, but are genetically distinct and have different chemotypes. In the C. melaleuca–complex at least two distinct chemical lineages are observed  with no currently known morphological correlation. There have been few studies investigating Calvitimela from a molecular phylogenetics perspective. Only one phylogeny focusing exclusively on Calvitimela has been published. They found Calvitimela, Tephromela and Violella to constitute a well-supported monophyletic group. The relationship between the main clades remained partly unresolved, however. No study has yet included all species currently circumscribed to Calvitimela, but the genus is so far indicated to be paraphyletic.

References

Lecanorales
Lecanorales genera
Lichen genera
Taxa named by Josef Hafellner
Taxa described in 2001